Papri chat or papri chaat is a popular traditional fast food and street food from the Indian subcontinent, in  India, Bangladesh, Nepal and Pakistan. Many various additional dishes throughout India are also referred to as papri chat. Some restaurants in the United States serve the traditional version of the dish.

Preparation

Papri chaat is traditionally prepared using crisp fried dough wafers known as papri, along with boiled chick peas, boiled potatoes, dahi (yogurt) and tamarind chutney and topped with chat masala and sev. The papri are typically prepared with refined white flour and ghee or oil. Mint, cilantro and spices may also be used. The dish has sweet, sour, tangy and spicy flavors and a creamy and crunchy texture.

Etymology
Papri refers to the wafers, and the word chaat is derived from Sanskrit verb caṭ means tasting with a fingertip and represents the sound made; thereby, it refers to several fast food dishes and snacks. Chaat is a thick cream in Hindi. The term also refers to a variety of dishes in India.

A recipe for papri (as purika) is mentioned  in Manasollasa, a 12th-century Sanskrit encyclopedia compiled by Someshvara III, who ruled from present-day Karnataka.

Street food
Papri chaat is often purveyed and consumed at mobile food stalls in India. In India, it is more popular in the northern region of the country compared to other areas.

References

External links
 

Indian snack foods
Indian fast food
Street food
Pakistani snack foods
Pakistani fast food
Yogurt-based dishes